Latina is a genus of South American chalcid wasps in the family Eucharitidae. There are four known species of Latina with three known in Argentina and one from Venezuela.

Originally the genus was named Laurella in 2002, but it turned out that the name had already been assigned to a genus of bee flies 30 years prior, and so the name Latina was adopted as a replacement, in honor of Latin America where the genus occurs.

Biology
Like all members of the Euchratidae, Latina wasps are ant parasitoids. The wasp lays eggs on the undersides of leaves near the nests of Ponerine ants. Within a few days the eggs hatch into planidial larvae that are mobile and can leap. They enter the ant colony, most likely being carried by, or riding on, the ants. Once inside, they seek out ant larvae as hosts. There the planidia attach to ant host larvae or prepupae where they feed. On completing their development they emerge, leaving the remains of the ant larva.

Species
Latina bonariensis - Argentina
Latina guriana - Venezuela
Latina rugosa - Argentina
Latina vianai - Argentina

References

Hymenoptera genera
Hymenoptera of South America
Chalcidoidea